The Rothesay tramway was a narrow gauge electric tramway on the Isle of Bute, Scotland.

History

The original tramway was opened in 1882 – a horse-drawn  gauge tramway running from the promenade at Rothesay to Port Bannatyne.

In 1901 the tramway was bought by British Electric Traction and closed on 2 March 1902 for modernisation. Some horse-drawn vehicles were re-gauged and operated a temporary service until the electrification was complete. Electric services started on 13 August 1902.

On 13 July 1905 a  extension from Port Bannatyne to Ettrick Bay along a reserved right of way was opened. It had been built by Dick, Kerr & Co.

On 1 January 1914, control of the company passed to the Scottish General Transport Company.

Fleet

1-10 Electric Railway and Tramway Carriage Works 1902 Toastracks
11-15 Electric Railway and Tramway Carriage Works 1902 Single-deck saloons
16-20 Brush Electrical Engineering Company 1903 Toastracks

Closure

On 1 June 1932, the company name changed to Western Scottish Motor Traction Company, and the tramway closed on 30 September 1936.

The depot in Port Bannatyne is still in use as a bus garage.

Bibliography

References 

Railways on Scottish Islands
3 ft 6 in gauge railways in Scotland
4 ft gauge railways in Scotland
Railway lines opened in 1882
Isle of Bute
Transport in Argyll and Bute
1882 establishments in Scotland
Tram transport in Scotland
Rothesay, Bute
Railway lines closed in 1936